Vasantasena (Fifth century BC) was a courtesan of Ujjayini according to ancient Indian literature, who earned fame and prosperity due to her finesse in various art forms such as singing, dancing, poetry, and courting as well as for her beauty. She is the lady protagonist of the Sanskrit play Mṛichchhakatika (The Little Clay Cart) written by Śūdraka.

Character in the Play 
In the play, Vasantasena is depicted as a strong character. She is not a conventional heroine waiting for a hero to come woo her. 

According to the play, Vasantasena falls in love with Chārudatta, a young Brahmin who loses all his wealth due to his philanthropic and altruistic nature and is seriously impoverished. The wealthy courtesan lives a life of utmost luxury but falls in love with Chārudatta for his extremely noble nature. Despite being happily married and having a son, Chārudatta also falls in love with Vasantasena for her beauty, her refined personality, and her noble nature.

In the play, she is shown to be very bold and courageous in expressing her love for Chārudatta, approaching him. The strength of her character is shown in full fervour when she goes to visit his house despite a raging storm, resembling an Abhisarika nayika. It is her, and not Chārudatta, who plays the dominant role in their love affair. Thus, she stands out as an unconventional figure of agency and strength in ancient Indian literature and medieval legend.

Art and Media 

Different works in the domain of arts and media have been produced at different points of time in history because the legend has been popular since times immemorial. Recognisable works have been listed down as follows:
 Sculpture from Kushana period: A mottled red sandstone sculpture belonging to the 2nd century A.D., which depicts a Scene of a Courtesan's House. It is kept in the National Museum, Delhi. 
 Oleograph by Raja Ravi Varma: The 19th-century Indian artist Raja Ravi Varma produced an oleograph depicting Vasantasena.
 Movies: 
 Vasantsena, a movie by Dadasaheb Phalke made in 1929
 Vasantha Sena, a Kannada movie by Ramayyar Shirur made in 1941
 Vasantha Sena, a Bollywood movie by Gajanan Jagirdar in 1942
 Vasantha Sena, a Tollywood movie by B. S. Ranga in 1967

Utsav is a 1984 Hindi erotic drama film, produced by Shashi Kapoor and directed by Girish Karnad and is based on this play.

References

Fictional Indian people
Indian courtesans
Prostitution in India
Fictional prostitutes